Jade Francis Castro (born August 21, 1978) is a Filipino film director, screenwriter, and producer. He is best known for writing and directing Endo (2007), and  Zombadings 1: Patayin sa Shokot si Remington (2011).

Early and personal life
Jade Castro was born on August 21, 1978. His mother Ruby, whose name takes after the gemstone of the same name, also named him and his brother Jasper after precious rocks: Jade and Jasper. He studied high school at Elizabeth Seton School in Las Piñas, and graduated with a degree in film from the University of the Philippines in 2000.

Career
Castro began his career as a script researcher for ABS-CBN, where he also served as second unit director in the network's soap opera television series Mula sa Puso (1999). He worked as a script supervisor for director Uro de la Cruz. Castro's directorial debut was the short film titled Hopya Love Me Too. He was reportedly involved in the production of the film Ang Pagdadalaga ni Maximo Oliveros (2005). Castro wrote the screenplays for comedy films D' Anothers (2005) and First Day High (2006). He made his breakthrough success with Endo (2007), a romantic independent film starring Jason Abalos and Ina Feleo. The film—which he wrote, directed and produced—won the Jury Prize at the 3rd Cinemalaya Independent Film Festival, and Best Screenplay at the 2007 Gawad Urian. Castro's direction of the romantic comedy My Big Love (2008) marked his transition to mainstream Philippine cinema. He co-wrote the screenplay with Raymond Lee and Michiko Yamamoto, and directed Zombadings 1: Patayin sa Shokot si Remington (2011), a gay-themed zombie comedy horror film starring Martin Escudero. Castro went on to direct My Kontrabida Girl (2012), Juana C. The Movie and My Lady Boss (2013), another gay-themed TV series Beki Boxer (2014), and LSS (Last Song Syndrome) (2019), a musically-driven film starring Gabbi Garcia, Khalil Ramos and Filipino indie folk/folk pop band Ben&Ben wherein Castro is also responsible for its story and screenplay.

In October 2015, it was announced by director Jerrold Tarog that he and Castro are working on a screenplay of the film adaptation of Arnold Arre's graphic novel The Mythology Class.

Filmography

Awards and nominations

References

External links
 
 

Filipino film directors
Filipino film producers
Filipino screenwriters
1978 births
Living people
Filipino male writers
Male screenwriters
University of the Philippines alumni
21st-century male writers
21st-century Filipino writers
21st-century screenwriters